Libertas ecclesiae ("freedom of the Church" in Latin) is the notion of freedom of religion of ecclesiastical authority of the Catholic Church from secular or the temporal power, which guided the Reform beginning in the 11th century.

Description
After the decentralization of the post-Carolingian period, this became the slogan of the Catholic Church in light of disapproval over lay warlords installing themselves as abbots and other high-profile churchmen. Unfit to perform theological functions, much less to defend the interests of the Catholic Church, these warlords viewed Catholic Church property as an extension of their own landholdings.

What resulted was the plunder of movable wealth (of which the monasteries had become the keepers during the period of Viking invasion) and the parcelling out of land and office as the temporal powers saw fit. This sorry state of the Catholic Church prompted enthusiasm for 'freeing' it from the direct control of these milites; Gregory VII helped frame this goal through the specifics of his reform program.

In addition to calling for spiritually pure figures at the helm of the Catholic Church, Pope Gregory VII addressed the practical problems of pluralism (holding more than one church office) and poorly educated clerics.

See also

 Dictatus papae

References

 Papal primacy: from its origins to the present by Klaus Schatz. Liturgical Press, 1996. 

Freedom of religion
11th-century Catholicism